Pyrus pseudopashia is a species of wild pear in the family Rosaceae, native to south-central China. As a crop wild relative of pears, it is in urgent need of conservation. Unfortunately all its accessions in the USDA-ARS National Pyrus Collection appear to have been misidentified or mislabeled.

References

pseudopashia
Endemic flora of China
Flora of South-Central China
Plants described in 1963